Maikel Daniel Costa (born 5 April 1988), known as Daniel Costa, is a Brazilian footballer who plays as an attacking midfielder for Portuguesa.

Club career
Born in Piracicaba, São Paulo, Daniel Costa was a youth product of hometown side XV de Piracicaba. In 2008, he played for Ituano and América-SP.

After representing Botafogo-SP and Taquaritinga during the 2009, Daniel Costa moved to Ponte Preta ahead of the 2010 campaign. After featuring sparingly, he returned to Botafogo for the Série D.

After playing for Catanduvense, Comercial-SP, América and Rio Branco-SP, all in his native state, Daniel Costa agreed to join Treze in December 2012. He scored ten goals in the 2013 Campeonato Paraibano, but his side finished second.

In November 2013, Daniel Costa moved to CSA. A regular starter, he signed for América de Natal the following 26 March, as a request of manager Oliveira Canindé.

Daniel Costa left América on 20 May 2015, and joined Santa Cruz the following day. On 23 December, after scoring seven goals as the club achieved promotion to the Série A, he renewed his contract.

Daniel Costa made his top tier debut on 13 June 2016, coming on as a second-half substitute for Fernando Gabriel in a 2–0 home loss against Santos. He left Santa in July, and moved to Turkish side Bandırmaspor shortly after.

Daniel Costa returned to his home country and CSA on 7 February 2017, and was a first-choice as the club achieved two consecutive promotions. On 17 December 2018, however, he moved to Criciúma.

On 8 January 2020, Daniel Costa was announced as the new signing of XV de Piracicaba, his first club. He joined Manaus in the third division on 3 October, but returned to his native state the following 4 January, after agreeing to a deal with São Bento.

On 26 May 2021, Daniel Costa joined Sampaio Corrêa in the second level. He returned to Manaus on 8 September, but moved to Portuguesa on 14 December.

Career statistics

Honours

Club
América de Natal
Campeonato Potiguar: 2015

Santa Cruz
Campeonato Pernambucano: 2016
Copa do Nordeste: 2016

CSA
Campeonato Brasileiro Série C: 2017
Campeonato Alagoano: 2018

Portuguesa
Campeonato Paulista Série A2: 2022

Individual
Campeonato Paulista Série A2 Best XI: 2022

References

1988 births
Living people
People from Piracicaba
Footballers from São Paulo (state)
Brazilian footballers
Association football midfielders
Campeonato Brasileiro Série A players
Campeonato Brasileiro Série B players
Campeonato Brasileiro Série C players
Campeonato Brasileiro Série D players
TFF First League players
Ituano FC players
América Futebol Clube (SP) players
Botafogo Futebol Clube (SP) players
Clube Atlético Taquaritinga players
Associação Atlética Ponte Preta players
Grêmio Catanduvense de Futebol players
Comercial Futebol Clube (Ribeirão Preto) players
Rio Branco Esporte Clube players
Treze Futebol Clube players
Centro Sportivo Alagoano players
América Futebol Clube (RN) players
Santa Cruz Futebol Clube players
Bandırmaspor footballers
Criciúma Esporte Clube players
Esporte Clube XV de Novembro (Piracicaba) players
Manaus Futebol Clube players
Esporte Clube São Bento players
Sampaio Corrêa Futebol Clube players
Associação Portuguesa de Desportos players
Brazilian expatriate footballers
Brazilian expatriate sportspeople in Turkey
Expatriate footballers in Turkey